The Argentine Automobile Club (ACA) is Argentina's largest automobile association.

It was founded on June 11, 1904, by Dalmiro Varela Castex, who in 1892 had imported the country's first registered automobile, a Daimler, and in 1894 its second (a De Dion-Bouton). The ACA oversaw the first recorded Argentine auto racing event, in 1906, and became a member of the International Automotive Federation in 1926. It began to develop of national network of service stations following a 1936 agreement with the state oil concern, YPF. Offering its membership cartographic, roadside assistance, insurance and other services, the ACA was inducted into the International Tourism Alliance in 1952.

Its national headquarters, designed in the Rationalist style by local architect Antonio U. Vilar and collaborators Alejandro Bustillo, was completed in 1942 on Buenos Aires' Avenida del Libertador. The building and its automobile museum are Palermo neighborhood landmarks.

In 1954, the club sponsored the Mil Kilometros de la Ciudad de Buenos Aires, inviting cars from the Sports Car Club of America, including one driven by Carroll Shelby.

Rally Argentina

Categories in which the Club participated 
Formula One (Scuderia Achille Varzi)
Formula Two (Automóvil Club Argentino)
FIA GT Championship (Escudería ACA Argentina)

Results

Scuderia Achille Varzi 
(key) (Results in bold indicate pole position; results in italics indicate fastest lap; † indicates shared drive.)

References 

fapyd.unr.edu.ar

External links 

Auto racing
Automobile associations
Organizations established in 1904
Formula One entrants
Formula Two entrants
FIA GT Championship teams
National sporting authorities of the FIA
Organisations based in Argentina
Emergency road services